The handball tournaments at the 2012 Olympic Games in London was held from 28 July to 12 August in the Olympic Park.

Preliminary rounds and the quarter-finals were held in the Copper Box while the semi-finals and final took place in the larger Basketball Arena.

Medals were awarded in a men's tournament and a women's tournament. The gold medals were won by France (men) and Norway (women).

Events
Two sets of medals were awarded in the following events:

 Men's handball (12 teams)
 Women's handball (12 teams)

Referees 

The executive committee of the International Handball Federation appointed 17 referee pairs for the 2012 Games:

  Charlotte Bonaventura and Julie Bonaventura
  Diana-Carmen Florescu and Anamaria Duță
  Carlos María Mariana and Darío Leonel Minore
  Yalatima Coulibali and Mamoudou Diabaté
  Matija Gubica and Boris Milošević
  Václav Horáček and Jiří Novotný
  Per Olesen and Lars Ejby Pedersen
  Oscar Raluy and Ángel Sabroso
  Nordine Lazaar and Laurent Reveret
  Brian Bartlett and Allan Stokes
  Lars Geipel and Marcus Helbig
  Gjorgi Nachevski and Slave Nikolov
  Kenneth Abrahamsen and Arne M. Kristiansen
  Mansour Abdulla Al-Suwaidi and Saleh Jamaan Bamurtef
  Nenad Krstič and Peter Ljubič
  Nenad Nikolić and Dušan Stojković
  Omar Mohammed Zubaeer Al-Marzouqi and Mohammed Rashid Mohamed Al-Nuaimi

Qualifying criteria 
Each National Olympic Committee may enter up to one men's and one women's team in the handball tournaments.

Men

Women

† Sweden qualified as 2010 European Championship runner up because Norway qualified as the 2011 World Champion.

Medal summary

Medal table

Medalists

References

External links 

 
 
 2012 Olympic handball qualification – men (format and results). TeamHandballNews.com.
 2012 Olympic handball qualification – women (format and results). TeamHandballNews.com.
 
 International Handball Federation
 European Handball Federation

 
2012 in handball
2012 Summer Olympics events
2012
International handball competitions hosted by the United Kingdom